Paparo is a town in Miranda State, Venezuela.

Populated places in Miranda (state)